La Mata may refer to:

La Mata, Dominican Republic, town in Sánchez Ramírez Province
La Mata, Panama, a town in Veraguas Province
La Mata (Grado), a parish of Grado, Asturias, Spain
La Mata, Toledo, a municipality in Toledo, Spain
La Mata de Ledesma, a town in Salamanca, Spain
La Mata de Morella, a town in Ports, Castellón, Valencian Community, Spain
La Mata de los Olmos, a municipality in Teruel, Aragon, Spain
Torre La Mata, or La Mata, a town in Alicante Community, Spain